The 2020 season is Santos Futebol Clube's 108th season in existence and the club's sixty-first consecutive season in the top flight of Brazilian football. As well as the Campeonato Brasileiro, the club competes in the Copa do Brasil, the Campeonato Paulista and also in Copa Libertadores.

On 22 November, José Carlos Peres was impeached from the presidency of the club, and Orlando Rollo (the former vice-president) assumed the position until the end of his term. José Carlos Peres had been out of office since 28 September.

Players

Squad information

Source: SantosFC.com.br (for appearances and goals), Wikipedia players' articles (for international appearances and goals), FPF (for contracts). Players in italic are not registered for the Campeonato Paulista

Copa Libertadores squad

Notes

Source: Conmebol.com

Appearances and goals

Last updated: 26 February 2021
Source: Match reports in Competitive matches, Soccerway

Goalscorers

Last updated: 22 February 2021
Source: Match reports in Competitive matches

Disciplinary record

As of 22 February 2021
Source: Match reports in Competitive matches
 = Number of bookings;  = Number of sending offs after a second yellow card;  = Number of sending offs by a direct red card.

Suspensions served

Managers

Transfers

Transfers in

Loans in

Transfers out

Loans out

Notes

Competitions

Overview

Campeonato Brasileiro

Results summary

Results by round

League table

Matches

Copa do Brasil

Round of 16

Campeonato Paulista

Results summary

Group stage

Matches

Knockout stage

Quarter-final

Copa Libertadores

Group stage

Knockout stage

Round of 16

Quarterfinal

Semifinal

Final

References

Notes

External links
Official Site 
Official YouTube Channel 

2020
Santos F.C.